Tukh Manuk (or Tux Manuk, (Armenian Թուխ Մանուկ), "Dark-skinned Youth") refers to archaic rural shrines in Armenia. Their origin is regarded to be pre-Christian or pagan, but are now a part of a folk tradition existing within the Armenian Church. Many are situated in church ruins or in crudely-built enclosures, others are well constructed stone chapels. Some of them are thought to date back to the 5th century, or even the BCE era.

Quite popular throughout Armenia, such shrines are often on hilltops, at the sources of springs, or just outside villages. Some researchers have linked them to a proto-Indo-European deity cognate with Krishna or Shiva, a mischievous  beautiful young man inhabiting the boundary between settlement and wilderness. Visiting Tukh Manuk shrines is traditionally popular with women. They are also visited by the Yazidis.  Pilgrims gather to make offerings or sacrifices for the curing of illnesses and burn candles.

Tukh Manuk is the main character in numerous medieval and modern folk poems, and is mentioned in the Armenian national epic Daredevils of Sassoun. Its stories are based on oral traditions of the 8th to the 10th century and the acts by a Christian King David in the city Sasun fighting heroically against the Arab invaders.

See also
Anahita
Aramazd
Astghik
Vahagn
Hayk
Anat
Sarpanit

References

External links
 Harry Terhanian: Love and lust. 
 Tukh Manuk. Armeniapedia